Carlos Robalo (died April 24, 2008) was a Portuguese politician and a member of the CDS – People's Party. Robalo served as Portugal's Secretary of State in 1980 and 1981 He was also instrumental in the creation of the Entidade Reguladora do Sector Eléctrico (ERSE).

Carlos Robalo died on April 24, 2008, at the age of 76 at a hospital in Tomar, Portugal.

References

External links 
 RTP News: Carlos Robalo, Portuguese Secretary of State, dies 

Year of birth missing
2008 deaths
CDS – People's Party politicians
Government ministers of Portugal